Raymond Bachand  (born October 22, 1947 in Montreal, Quebec) is a former politician, a businessman and a lawyer in Quebec, Canada. He was the Member of the National Assembly of Quebec (MNA) for the riding of Outremont, and a member of the Quebec Liberal Party caucus. He is the former Minister of Finance and Revenue in the majority government of Premier of Quebec Jean Charest, and was previously Minister for Tourism during the minority government mandate from April 2007 to October 2008, and Minister of economic development of innovation and export trade from his election until June 2009. Bachand is a former trade unionist. On August 26, 2013 Bachand resigned his seat.

Early life and education
Bachand was educated at the Collège Stanislas, a private school. He obtained a law degree from the Université de Montréal in 1969 and was admitted to the Quebec Bar in 1970. Bachand also completed a master's degree and a doctorate at Harvard Business School.

Before entering politics, he worked in several key positions including in the Quebec's public sector where he worked in the Ministry of Labour as well as in the premier's office.  Bachand was a Quebec sovereignist during the 1980 referendum, and an organizer for the 'Yes' campaign.  He changed his mind, and is now a Canadian federalist.

He also taught at the École des hautes études commerciales de Montréal in the early 1970s.

He was once the vice-president of Culinar and Métro-Richelieu and was also president of Groupe Secor during the 1980s and 1990s.  He was president-director general of the Fonds de solidarité des travailleurs du Québec (FTQ), a major union fund, between 1997 and 2001. He was also part of the administration of Montreal newspaper Le Devoir and member of Montreal's Chamber of Commerce.

Politics
Bachand was elected on December 12, 2005, in Outremont in a by-election after the retirement of former Finance Minister Yves Séguin. There was speculation that Bachand would also occupy that post, but he was awarded the portfolio of Economic Development.

Bachand was easily re-elected in the 2007 elections defeating Parti Québécois's Salim Laaroussi by nearly 6,000 votes. He was re-appointed as the minister of economic development, innovation and international trade and was also given the portfolios of tourism and the region of Montreal. Following the 2008 election, Bachand gave up the tourism portfolio to Laporte MNA Nicole Ménard. On April 8, 2009, following the retirement of Monique Jérôme-Forget, Bachand was named the new Finance Minister.

With the defeat of the Liberal government of Jean Charest, Bachand was replaced by Nicolas Marceau of the Parti Québécois as Minister of Finance. He was a candidate to succeed Jean Charest as Liberal Party leader but lost to Philippe Couillard on March 17, 2013.

On August 26, 2013 Bachand resigned his seat as MNA for Outremont.

Electoral record

References

External links
 

1947 births
Living people
Businesspeople from Montreal
Canadian expatriates in the United States
Finance ministers of Quebec
Harvard Business School alumni
Academic staff of HEC Montréal
Lawyers from Montreal
Members of the Executive Council of Quebec
Officers of the Order of Canada
Politicians from Montreal
Quebec Liberal Party MNAs
Université de Montréal Faculty of Law alumni
21st-century Canadian politicians